The Governor of Orenburg Oblast is the head of government of Orenburg Oblast, a federal subject of Russia.

The position was introduced in 1991 as Head of Administration of Orenburg Oblast. The Governor is elected by direct popular vote for a term of five years.

List of officeholders

References 

Politics of Orenburg Oblast
 
Orenburg